The fastest times in the swimming events at the Southeast Asian Games are designated as the Southeast Asian Games records in swimming. The events are held in a long course (50 m) pool. All records were set in finals unless noted otherwise.

Singapore has historically proven to be a powerhouse in swimming, especially in Southeast Asia. As a result, most records are held by Singaporeans.

History
The 2009 Games were held in Vientiane, Laos where the records for 25 events were broken. Of these, 12 records were broken by Singapore, eight by Malaysia, two by the Philippines, and one each by Indonesia, Thailand and Vietnam. However, most of these records were broken while non-textile swimsuits were legal for use between February 2008 and December 2009. They have since been banned in January 2010. To date, 5 records set using the non-textile swimsuits remain in the record books.

Men

Women

Record holders' rankings

By nation

By individual (men)
The following lists athletes holding three or more records in Southeast Asian swimming.

By individual (women)
The following lists athletes holding three or more records in Southeast Asian swimming.

See also
 List of Southeast Asian Championships records in swimming

References

External links

Southeast Asian Games
Records
Records
Swimming records
Swimming